The Australian Three Peaks Race is a short-handed offshore sailing and endurance mountain running event that was held in Tasmania, the southernmost state of Australia, over the Easter long weekend. The first race was in 1989 and the race was conducted annually until Easter 2013.

It was a non-stop event, commencing at Beauty Point just north of Launceston on the Tamar River, during which runners were transported by yacht finishing in the Tasmanian capital city some three to four days later.  Teams of three sailors and two runners often comprising members of armed forced, professions, youth or other groups would compete against teams from the general sailing and running communities.

The course took teams from the northern Tasmanian port of Beauty Point to Hobart in the south. Three sailing legs and three endurance running legs took the yachts and their teams past some of Tasmania's spectacular coastal scenery including the highest sea cliffs in the Southern Hemisphere soaring some 300 metres.
 90 nmi to Flinders Island (settlement of Lady Barron) in Bass Strait where two runners proceed to the top of Mount Strzelecki (65 km run; 756 m ascent);
 145 nmi to Coles Bay where two runners scale Mount Freycinet (33 km run; 620 m ascent); and
 100 nmi to Hobart on the River Derwent where two runners top Mount Wellington (33 km run; 1270 m ascent), and finishing in Hobart.

The race course was approximately:
 Sail: 335 nm;
 Run: 131 km;
 Ascent: 2646 m.

The concept of the race is similar to the British Barmouth to Fort William Three Peaks Yacht Race. The Tasmanian race was inaugurated in 1989 after a team competed in the 1987 British event.  The race has been an annual event for 25 years until the last race was conducted in 2013.  Changes in social patterns have affected many offshore sailing races in Australia in recent years and the Three Peaks Race was no exception failing to attract a viable number of entrants. The organising committee made the painful decision to defer running the event until economic and social pressures ease to make the race again viable.

Events by Year

H W (Bill) Tilman Trophy Winners
The Tilman Trophy has been a keenly contested section of the race.  The trophy is named after the famed Harold William (Bill) Tilman CBE, DSO, MC, FRGS, FRIN Soldier, Mountaineer, Explorer, Sailor 1898–1977 who was the first President of the United Kingdom-based Barmouth to Fort William Three Peaks Yacht Race.  The UK organising committee in 1989 kindly donated a silver tray trophy to be awarded to the first team to win the race based on a points system that favoured older teams, older yachts and all round participation.

 2013: Whistler, David Rees
 2012: Centre Euro Wines, David Allan
 2011: Team Cradle Mountain Chateau, David Allan
 2010: Team CommunityCarbon, Jeff Dusting, Rick Pacey, Graham Smith, Stuart Jacobson, Travis Tremayne
 2009: Team Chance, Bob Grant and team
 2008: Team Stornoway, Richard Gardner
 2007 PRD Nationwide Tamar Valley, Greg Hall
 2006 Alize, Phillip Amos
 2005 Liberte, Anthony Cook
 2004 Misty, Brian Claque
 2003 Downing Street, Andrew Ostler
 2002 Mobil Kingston Beach, Angus Sprott
 2001 Camp Quality, Benny Parsons
 2000 Camp Quality, Benny Parsons
 1999 Underwater Video Systems, Jeff Cordell
 1998 Brigitta Bits 4 Boats, Peter Crawford
 1997 Tamar Marine, Rob Giblin
 1996 Every One An Original, Angus Sprott
 1995 MMI Insurance, John Saul
 1994 Southern Cross Network II, Greg Prescott
 1993 Coles Bay Business, Glenn Myler
 1992 French Pine, Peter Crawford/Ron Brooker
 1991 Underwater Video Systems, Kerry Boden
 1990 Risky Business, Richard Edmunds
 1989 Budget Rent-A-Car, Don Calvert

Overall Race winners
 2013: Euphoria Furniture, Steve Laird
 2012: Big Wave Rider, Bruce Arms (skipper), Jessica Watson
 2011: Peccadillo, Charles Meredith
 2010: Team Whistler, David Rees
 2009: Neil Buckby Motors Subaru, Phillip Marshall
 2008: Shearwater Pure Sprouts, Phillip Marshall
 2007: Neil Buckby Motors, Phillip Marshall
 2006: Marshall Engineering, Phillip Marshall
 2005: Elite Renovations, Phillip Marshall
 2004: Orana Respite Mersey Pharmacy, Robin Chamberlin & Terry Travers
 2003: API Mersey Pharmacy, Robin Chamberlin & Terry Travers
 2002: API Mersey Pharmacy, Robin Chamberlin & Terry Travers
 2001: API Mersey Pharmacy, Robin Chamberlin & Terry Travers
 2000: Haphazard, Nick Edmunds
 1999: Computerland, John Saul
 1998: Business Post Naiad, Bruce Guy
 1997: Computerland, John Saul
 1996: Optus World, John Saul
 1995: Southern Cross News, Richard Edmunds
 1994: Redbook Performance Plus Carpets, Ken Gourlay
 1993: Windswept, Martin Pryor
 1992: Ronstan Wild Thing, Grant Wharrington
 1991: Hazadatas, Nick Edmunds
 1990: Ericsson, Rob Cassidy
 1989: Inaugural winner Verbatim, Ian Johnston, Cathy Hawkins

See also
 Three Peaks

References

External links
 Three Peaks Race site

1989 establishments in Australia
Mountain running competitions
Recurring sporting events established in 1989
Sailing competitions in Australia
Sailing in Tasmania